Sha'ban, Shaban, Sha'baan, Shabaan, Sha'aban, Shaaban, Shaabaan,  Saban, Sheban or Shabon may refer to a month of the Islamic calendar, or to:

Geography
Shaban, East Azerbaijan, a village in Iran
Shaban, Hamadan, a village in Iran
Shaban, Lorestan, a village in Iran
Shaban, Zanjan, a village in Iran
Shaban Rural District (Ardabil Province), Iran
Shaban Rural District (Hamadan Province), Iran
Shahban, Lower Dir

See also
Shaban (name)
Saban (disambiguation)

sr:Шабан